West Damar, or North Damar, is an Austronesian language of Damar Island, one of the Maluku Islands of Indonesia. In spite of rather low cognacy rates with its neighboring languages, it can be classified as part of the Babar languages based on qualitative evidence.

It is only spoken in the village of Batumerah, located on the north-western part of Damar.

Vocabulary
Vocabulary list:

Sample sentences

 - Are you ill?

 - Yes, I have a headache.

 - The mountain Binaya is the highest at the Seram island.

See also
East Damar language

References

Further reading
Michael Chlenov & Svetlana Chlenova, 2006. "West Damar language or Damar-Batumerah, an isolate in South-Eastern Indonesia." Tenth International Conference on Austronesian Linguistics, 17–20 January 2006, Palawan, Philippines.

Babar languages
Languages of the Maluku Islands